Solomon King is a New Zealand rugby union player who plays for the New Zealand Sevens team.

Career highlights
NZ Sevens 2006 - 2011
chiefs WTG 2009
New Zealand U21 2006
North Harbour NPC 2011
Bay of Plenty NPC 2006, 2010
Bay of Plenty Development 2003 - 2006

References
 Sevens Profile

1985 births
Bay of Plenty rugby union players
North Harbour rugby union players
Coca-Cola Red Sparks players
People educated at Massey High School
Living people
New Zealand rugby union players
Rugby union players from Rotorua
Expatriate rugby union players in Japan
New Zealand expatriate sportspeople in Japan
New Zealand international rugby sevens players